Zireklya (Yerekle) is a rural locality (a village) in Maxyutovsky Selsoviet, Kugarchinsky District, Bashkortostan, Russia. The population was 186 as of 2010. There are 2 streets.

Geography 
Zireklya is located 62 km south of Mrakovo (the district's administrative centre) by road. Maxyutovo is the nearest rural locality.

References 

Rural localities in Kugarchinsky District